Carasobarbus moulouyensis is a ray-finned fish species in the family Cyprinidae. It is found only in Morocco.

Its natural habitat is rivers. It is not considered a threatened species by the IUCN.

The taxonomy and systematics of the Maghreb barbs are subject to considerable dispute. Some authors consider C. moulouyensis a distinct species, while others include it in the Algerian barb (Luciobarbus callensis).

References

Carasobarbus
Endemic fauna of Morocco
Fish described in 1924
Taxonomy articles created by Polbot